Watergate salad, also referred to as Pistachio Delight or Shut the Gate salad, or colloquially as Green Goop, Green Goddess salad, Green Fluff, Green Stuff, or Mean Green is a side dish salad or dessert salad made from pistachio pudding, canned pineapple, whipped topping, crushed pecans, and marshmallows. It is very quick and simple to prepare: the ingredients are combined and then chilled, if desired or required. It is a popular dish in the Upper Midwest and other areas of the U.S. where potlucks are popular.

Canned pineapple is usually used, but other canned fruit, e.g., fruit cocktail and/or mandarin oranges, can be substituted, and there are many slight variations that use additional ingredients. Watergate salad is similar to ambrosia salad, which includes pineapple and marshmallows as part of its base ingredients, and whipped topping and nuts as part of its variational repertoire.

Etymology

The origin of the name “Watergate salad” is obscure. The recipe was published by General Foods (since merged into what is now Kraft Heinz) and called for two General Foods products: Jell-O instant pistachio pudding and Cool Whip whipped topping, a whipped-cream substitute. According to Kraft, "There are several urban myths regarding the name change, but we can't substantiate any of them." Several competing explanations exist.

Kraft Corporate Affairs said: "We developed the recipe for Pistachio Pineapple Delight. It was in 1975, the same year that pistachio pudding mix came out." Kraft, however, didn't refer to it as Watergate Salad until consumers started requesting the recipe for it under the name. "According to Kraft Kitchens, when the recipe for Pistachio Pineapple Delight was sent out, an unnamed Chicago food editor renamed it Watergate Salad to promote interest in the recipe when she printed it in her column." Neither the article nor editor has been tracked down, however.

The Denver Post, in the Empire Magazine of June 27, 1976, published a recipe for Watergate Salad. It is sometimes said that Watergate salad was invented by a sous chef at the Watergate Hotel, and it was then served at brunch on most weekends. Watergate Salad took off in popularity during and after the presidential scandal which shares the same name. However, the Denver Post article does not verify this rumor, noting like most sources that the origins of the name are obscure.

Syndicated household advice columnists Anne Adams and Nan Nash-Cummings, in their "Anne & Nan" column of October 9, 1997, reported that name came from the similar "Watergate Cake" (which shares most of the same ingredients): "The recipes came out during the Watergate scandal. The cake has a 'cover-up' icing and is full of nuts. The salad is also full of nuts." Both cake and salad were part of a trend for satirically-named recipes such as Nixon's Perfectly Clear Consomme and Liddy's Clam-Up Chowder.

In 1922 Helen Keller published a similar recipe, calling for canned diced pineapple, nuts, marshmallows, whipped cream and other ingredients. "I ate it first in California, so I call it Golden Gate Salad". Similar "fruit salad" and "pineapple salad" recipes had been published in the 1910s, and "Golden Gate Salad" was served in some American hotels.

See also
 List of salads

References

American desserts
Salads
Cuisine of the Midwestern United States
Fruit salads
Sweet salads
American salads